Ghulam Haider Wyne (1940 – 29 September 1993) was a Pakistani politician who served as the tenth Chief Minister of Punjab. He was a member of Islami Jamhoori Ittehad and later Pakistan Muslim League (N)

Early life 
Wyne's family migrated from India to Pakistan in 1947 after the independence of Pakistan.

Political career
He was the Leader of the Opposition (Pakistan) and former chief minister of Pakistan's most populous province Punjab (Pakistan). He held chief minister's position from 1990 to 1993, when President Ghulam Ishaq Khan dissolved the Provincial Assembly of the Punjab and removed his government in 1993 from Punjab along with Nawaz Sharif's government in Pakistan.

Ghulam Haider had risen from an ordinary political worker to the opposition leader in the National Assembly of Pakistan and later the Chief Minister of Punjab, Pakistan. He regretted that the nation had not followed the principles of Quaid-i-Azam and the objectives for which he had established Pakistan could not be achieved. He was a down to earth politician who had devoted his life for the welfare of the nation. He led a simple and honourable life in an ordinary house in the ghettos of Mian Channu. He never plundered national wealth like some other politicians. Once he presented few copies of daily Nawa-i-Waqt which were kept in an old iron box and said he had carried these copies from Amritsar while migrating to Pakistan. He visited England to collect donations for his school projects.

Nazaria-i-Pakistan Trust
Ghulam Haider Wyne was the founder and very first chairman of Nazaria-i-Pakistan Trust (NPT) which he established in July 1992. He provided over 40 kanal land to the Nazaria-i-Pakistan Trust near Johar Town Lahore. He set up over 18 educational institutions in the small city of Mian Channu. For his contributions in promoting education, he is still remembered as Sir Syed Ahmad Khan of Mian Channu after his death.

Death and legacy
Ghulam Haider Wyne was murdered near Mian Channu while doing the rounds of his election campaign on 29 September 1993. In October 2015, his convicted killer was executed in jail.

In October 2004, an event was organized by the Nazaria-i-Pakistan Foundation and Pakistan Movement Workers Trust in Lahore where Justice Javed Iqbal and veteran journalist Majid Nizami paid tributes to Ghulam Haider Wyne.

A road near Mian Channu city was named after Ghulam Haider Wyne by Punjab Chief Minister Shahbaz Sharif in October 2009.

References

External links
 Nazaria-i-Pakistan Trust's Official Site
 Chief Minister Of Punjab Official Site
 Official site of Sehgal Family

|-

|-

1940 births
Chief Ministers of Punjab, Pakistan
1993 deaths
People from Khanewal District
Punjabi people
Pakistan Muslim League (N) politicians